Acapulco Fútbol Club was a Mexican professional football team based in Acapulco, Mexico that played in Liga de Balompié Mexicano.

History
The team was announced on June 4, 2020 during the celebration of a meeting of teams of the Liga de Balompié Mexicano, becoming the eighth official franchise of the new league At the time of its foundation, the club had orange and black as its official colors. In August, the team had a change in its identity, going to use the colors blue, white and gold. On November 17, 2020 the team was disaffiliated by the LBM due to debts.

Stadium 
Unidad Deportiva Acapulco (English:Acapulco Sports Complex) is a sports complex composed of a 13,000-seat soccer and track and field stadium and a baseball stadium which can seat thousands. The soccer/track stadium, which originally seated 8,600, is currently home to the Acapulco F.C. soccer team of the Liga de Balompié Mexicano. The baseball stadium is currently used for amateur and semi-pro baseball, and skateboarding.

Players

First-team squad

References

Association football clubs established in 2020
2020 establishments in Mexico
Acapulco
Football clubs in Guerrero
Liga de Balompié Mexicano Teams
2020 disestablishments in Mexico
Association football clubs disestablished in 2020